FC Fyn was a Danish football club from Odense on Funen. The club was founded in 2006 and its first appearance was in the 2006–07 season.

FC Fyn played their home matches at Odense Atletikstadion, which is the current home ground of B 1909 and B 1913. The first manager was former Zambia national coach Roald Poulsen. Poulsen resigned for personal reasons in the end of 2007 and was replaced by Viggo Jensen.

The team's home shirt was half red and half blue, while the away shirt was yellow.

The club was declared bankrupt on 31 January 2013.

Mother clubs
The club was a merger between three clubs from the Danish 2nd Division West, which were:
 B 1909
 B 1913
 Dalum IF

Following the dissolving of the club, the three mother clubs were reestablished in the lower leagues.

Club statistics

All time league records

References

External links
 

 
Sport in Odense
2006 establishments in Denmark
Defunct football clubs in Denmark
Association football clubs established in 2006
2013 disestablishments in Denmark
Association football clubs disestablished in 2013